Hierotheos or Hierotheus may refer to:

 Hierotheos the Thesmothete, traditional first bishop of Athens in the 1st century
 , legendary bishop of Segovia in the 1st century
 , active in Hungary in the 10th century
 , Constantinopolitan letter writer in the 12th century
 Hierotheos, religious name of John Komnenos Molyvdos (1657–1719), Greek Orthodox metropolitan and scholar
  (1682–1766), German priest and writer
 Hierotheus I of Alexandria, Greek Patriarch of Alexandria in 1825–1845
 Hierotheus II of Alexandria, Greek Patriarch of Alexandria in 1847–1858
 Hierotheos of Antioch, Greek Patriarch of Antioch in 1850–1885
 Hierotheus of Jerusalem, Greek Patriarch of Jerusalem in 1875–1882
 Hierotheos Vlachos (born 1945), Greek Orthodox metropolitan and theologian
  (born 1977), Bulgarian Orthodox bishop

See also
The Book of Hierotheos, purported work of Hierotheos the Thesmothete, actually by Stephen bar Sudayli